Chalow Gohreh is a village in Gohreh Rural District, Fin District, Bandar Abbas County, Hormozgan Province, Iran. At the 2006 census, its population was 319, in 70 families.

References 

Populated places in Bandar Abbas County